Station-keeping in a nautical situation is when a vessel is to:

 maintain a position in relation to another moving vessel or vessels, such as when
 conducting underway replenishment or
 part of a task force or convoy
 maintaining a fixed position in relation to a fixed object or
 patrolling a defined sector in relation to a fixed object.

See also
 Dynamic positioning

Navigation